Protagoras was a pre-Socratic Greek philosopher.

Protagoras may also refer to:

 Protagoras (crater), a lunar impact crater
 Protagoras (dialogue), a dialogue of Plato